The 2016 Leinster Senior Football Championship was the 2016 installment of the annual Leinster Senior Football Championship held under the auspices of Leinster GAA. The competition ran from 14 May 2016 to 17 July 2016.

Dublin came into the competition as the defending champions, having won their 54th title and completed a 5-in-a-row the previous season. The draw for the championship was made on 16 October 2015. As in the previous two seasons, the two sides were named as A and B, to allow for teams to more easily predict the dates of their qualifier matches. Carlow, Dublin, Laois, Louth, Meath and Wicklow were named to the A side, with Kildare, Longford, Offaly, Westmeath and Wexford on the B side.

The final was a replay of the previous year's decider, with Dublin facing Westmeath. Dublin won 2-19 to 0-10 in the final at Croke Park, the county's first six-in-a-row since the 1970s.

Teams
The Leinster championship was contested by 11 of the 12 county teams in Leinster, a province of Ireland. Kilkenny was the only county team not to compete.

Bracket

Preliminary round refs		
Quarter-final refs

Preliminary round

Quarter-finals

Semi-finals

Final

See also
 2016 All-Ireland Senior Football Championship
 2016 Connacht Senior Football Championship
 2016 Munster Senior Football Championship
 2016 Ulster Senior Football Championship

References

2L
Leinster Senior Football Championship